America's Got Talent: All-Stars (also known as AGT: All-Stars) is an American reality television and talent competition series that premiered on NBC on January 2, 2023. The "all-stars" series is a spinoff featuring winners, finalists, fan favorites, and others from previous seasons of America's Got Talent and across the Got Talent franchise. Terry Crews hosts the series, with Simon Cowell, Heidi Klum, and Howie Mandel serving as judges. In the finale, the winner receives a cash prize of $500,000.

Production 
On October 7, 2022, NBC announced its third spin-off of the main series. Similar to the first spin-off, America's Got Talent: The Champions, the "all-stars" format will include past winners, finalists, and fan favorites from across previous seasons of the franchise, competing for the All-Star title. The series, with judges Simon Cowell, Heidi Klum, and Howie Mandel as well as host Terry Crews, began production in October 2022, and premiered on January 2, 2023.

Overview 
The contest's preliminaries feature around 10 participants. While those receiving a golden buzzer in each preliminary secure an automatic place in the grand finale, contestants compete for the remaining places. The following table lists each contestant who took part, and their history in the Got Talent franchise – per respective international version, season, and performance, in chronological order from first to more recent appearance:

  The act is made up of members of both Light Balance and Light Balance Kids, as some members of Light Balance Kids were unable to leave Ukraine due to the ongoing conflict. However, the act is still credited as just Light Balance Kids.

Preliminaries Summary
 |  | 
 |  |  Buzzed out

Preliminary 1 (January 2)

Preliminary 2 (January 9)

Preliminary 3 (January 16) 

  Iwasaki intentionally hit Mandel's buzzer as part of his act.

Preliminary 4 (January 23) 

  Simon Cowell attempted to buzz the act but the buzzer was disabled.

Preliminary 5 (January 30)

Preliminary 6 (February 6)

Finals (February 20)
 |  |  | 

  Bello Sisters and Aidan Bryant conducted a joint routine for their second performance, and thus shared the same guest performer.
  Light Balance Kids and Kodi Lee conducted a joint routine for their second performance.

Ratings

References

External links 
 
 

2020s American reality television series
2023 American television series debuts
Competitions in the United States
English-language television shows
American live television shows
America's Got Talent
American television spin-offs
NBC original programming
Reality television spin-offs
Talent shows
Television series by Fremantle (company)